

Kurt Herzog (27 March 1889, Quedlinburg – 8 May 1948) was a German general during World War II. He was a recipient of the  Knight's Cross of the Iron Cross with Oak Leaves. A war criminal, Herzog surrendered to the Soviet troops in May 1945 and died in captivity on 8 May 1948.

Awards and decorations
 Iron Cross (1914) 2nd Class (26 October 1914) & 1st Class  (6 November 1916)

 Clasp to the Iron Cross (1939) 2nd Class (10 September 1939) & 1st Class (29 September 1939)
 Knight's Cross of the Iron Cross with Oak Leaves
 Knight's Cross on 18 October 1941 as Generalleutnant and commander of 291. Infanterie-Division
Oak Leaves on 12 January 1945 as General der Artillerie and commander of XXXVIII.Armeekorps

References

Citations

Bibliography

 
 

1889 births
1948 deaths
People from Quedlinburg
Generals of Artillery (Wehrmacht)
German Army personnel of World War I
Recipients of the clasp to the Iron Cross, 1st class
Recipients of the Knight's Cross of the Iron Cross with Oak Leaves
German prisoners of war in World War II held by the Soviet Union
German people who died in Soviet detention
People from the Province of Saxony
Military personnel from Saxony-Anhalt